Graff Racing is an auto racing team based in France. The team was founded in 1985 by French racing driver Jean-Philippe Grand, who has competed under his own name since the late 1970s and won the French Formula Ford in 1984. As of 2011, the team has returned to endurance racing, competing in the Blancpain Endurance Series, Porsche Carrera Cup, and European Le Mans Series.

References

External links
 
 

French auto racing teams
Formula Renault Eurocup teams
British Formula Three teams
Blancpain Endurance Series teams
French Formula 3 teams

European Le Mans Series teams
World Sportscar Championship teams
Auto racing teams established in 1985
1985 establishments in France
24 Hours of Le Mans teams